The Fourth Council of Constantinople was the eighth ecumenical council of the Catholic Church held in Constantinople from October 5, 869, to February 28, 870. It was poorly attended, the first session by only 12 bishops and the number of bishops later never exceeded 103. In contrast the pro-Photian council of 879–80 was attended by 383 bishops. The Council met in ten sessions from October 869 to February 870 and issued 27 canons.

The council was called by Emperor Basil I the Macedonian, with the support of Pope Hadrian II. It deposed Photius, a layman who had been appointed as Patriarch of Constantinople, and reinstated his predecessor Ignatius.

The Council also reaffirmed the decisions of the Second Council of Nicaea in support of icons and holy images and required the image of Christ to have veneration equal with that of the gospel book.

A later council, the Greek Fourth Council of Constantinople, was held after Photios had been reinstated on the order of the emperor. Today, the Catholic Church recognizes the council in 869–870 as "Constantinople IV", while the Eastern Orthodox Churches recognize the councils in 879–880 as "Constantinople IV" and revere Photios as a saint. Whether and how far the Greek Fourth Council of Constantinople was confirmed by Pope John VIII is a matter of dispute. There is substantial evidence that he did in fact accept it, anathematising the council of 869 in his Letters to the Emperors Basil, Leo and Alexander, which were read in the second session of the 879/80 council, his letter to Photios  and his Commonitorium. Francis Dvornik has argued that subsequent popes accepted the council of 879 as binding, only choosing the council of 869–70 as ecumenical 200 years later after the Great Schism due to issues with certain canons (namely the implicit condemnation of the filioque). Siecienski disagrees with Dvornik's assessment. The previous seven ecumenical councils are recognized as ecumenical and authoritative by both Eastern Orthodox and Catholic Christians.

Background
With the coronation of Charlemagne by Pope Leo III in 800, the papacy had acquired a new protector in the West. This freed the pontiffs to some degree from the power of the emperor in Constantinople but it also led to a schism, because the emperors and patriarchs of Constantinople interpreted themselves as the true descendants of the Roman Empire.

After the Byzantine emperor summarily dismissed St. Ignatius of Constantinople as patriarch of that city, Pope Nicholas I refused to recognize his successor Patriarch Photios I of Constantinople. Photios did not at this stage raise the Filioque issue. The Council condemned Photius and defrocked his supporters in the clergy.

Photian schism
In 858, Photius, a noble layman from a local family, was appointed Patriarch of Constantinople, the most senior episcopal position save only that of Rome. Emperor Michael III had deposed the previous patriarch, Ignatius. Ignatius refused to abdicate, setting up a power struggle between the Emperor and Pope Nicholas I. The 869–870 Council condemned Photius and deposed him as patriarch and reinstated his predecessor Ignatius. It also ranked Constantinople before the other three Eastern patriarchates of Alexandria, Antioch and Jerusalem.

Support for icons and holy images
One of the key elements of the Council was the reaffirmation of the decisions of the Second Council of Nicaea in support of icons and holy images. The council thus helped stamp out any remaining embers of Byzantine iconoclasm. Specifically, its third Canon required the image of Christ to have veneration equal with that of the gospel book:

We decree that the sacred image of our Lord Jesus Christ, the liberator and Savior of all people, must be venerated with the same honor as is given the book of the holy Gospels. For as through the language of the words contained in this book all can reach salvation, so, due to the action which these images exercise by their colors, all wise and simple alike, can derive profit from them. For what speech conveys in words, pictures announce and bring out in colors.

The council also encouraged the veneration of the images of the Virgin Mary, angels and saints:
If anyone does not venerate the image of Christ our Lord, let him be deprived of seeing him in glory at his second coming. The image of his all pure Mother and the images of the holy angels as well as the images of all the saints are equally the object of our homage and veneration.

Notes

References
 Cross, F. L. (ed.). The Oxford dictionary of the Christian church. New York: Oxford University Press (2005).
 
 
 

Constantinople,870,Catholic
Constantinople,870
860s in the Byzantine Empire
Catholic,4
870s in the Byzantine Empire
Filioque
869
870